is a 1992 action-adventure game developed and published by Sega for the Mega Drive. The game was never localized outside Japan, with an English fan translation patch releasing in 2006. Critics compared it to Nintendo's The Legend of Zelda series.

Summary
The player controls the role of young fighter. He was raised by the local wise man in a small house somewhere in a fantasy world. After becoming a skilled swordsman, the hero is sent to the South Cave to dispatch some terrible monsters. Even more fearsome monsters are confronted in every new place until he finally challenges the bad guy who controls all the evil in the world.

There are real-time combat elements in addition to light role-playing elements. Weapons are equipped and used on monsters in real time. Obstacles must be overcome and items must be found in order to save the world.

References

1992 video games
Fantasy video games
Role-playing video games
Sega Genesis games
Sega Genesis-only games
Video games developed in Japan
Sega games